Avante (Portuguese: "forwards") can refer to:
Avante!, a Portuguese Communist newspaper
Avante International Optical scan voting system
Hyundai Elantra, also known as the Hyundai Avante
Tamiya Avante, a 1/10-scale radio-controlled buggy introduced by MRC-Tamiya in 1988
Avante (album), Portuguese-language album by the singer Joelma 2016
Avante, Portuguese-language album by Siba (singer) 2012
Avante (political party), a political party in Brazil